Sir John Lyon, Thane of Glamis, jure uxoris Thane of Tannadyce (4 November 1382), was Chamberlain of Scotland between 1377 and 1382.

Family origins
See main article: Lyons family

Sir John Lyon was the son of Sir John Lyon (born ), feudal baron of Forteviot and Forgandenny in Perthshire, and Curteton and Drumgowan in Aberdeenshire. Sir John is widely accepted as being the progenitor of Clan Lyon, a claim verified by renowned historian Sir Iain Moncreiffe of that Ilk. His origins were French, his surname being an anglicised version of the Norman family "de Leonne".

Career and death
He was first appointed to a position at the Scottish court sometime prior to 1368 in the reign of David II, when he was given the responsibility of examining the records of the Chamberlain. He was appointed Keeper of the Privy Seal upon the accession of Robert II; from c. 1375 he was the Keeper of Edinburgh Castle, and was appointed Lord Chamberlain in 1377, both positions he was to hold until his death.

From at least as early as 1367 he started to acquire various properties, from the Earl of Ross in 1367, from John de Hay in 1368. He acquired the thanage of Glamis from his future father-in-law in March 1372. He was knighted sometime prior to 1377. He was killed (perhaps rather treacherously) on 4 November 1382 during a quarrel with Sir James Lindsay of Crawford, nephew of the King, near Menmuir in Angus.

Marriage and children
Sometime in 1376, Sir John Lyon married Princess Johanna (Jean), daughter of Robert II and Elizabeth Mure, daughter of Sir Adam Mure of Rowallan. The Princess was the widow of Sir John Keith, eldest son of the Earl Marischal. After Sir John Lyon's death, Johanna married Sir James Sandilands. Sir John Lyon and the Princess had only one child, another Sir John Lyon.

On 28 June 1445, his grandson, Patrick Lyon was created Lord Glamis. In 1606, Patrick, 9th Lord Glamis was created Earl of Kinghorne.

See also
Lyons family

References

Bibliography

Lord Chamberlains of Scotland
14th-century Scottish people
Political office-holders in Scotland
John
1340s births
1382 deaths
Year of birth uncertain